Agios Nikolaos ("Saint Nicholas") is an islet with a church (Agios Nikolaos) on the northern coast of Crete in the Aegean Sea. Administratively, it is located within the municipality of Georgioupoli, in Chania regional unit.

See also
List of islands of Greece

Landforms of Chania (regional unit)
Uninhabited islands of Crete
Mediterranean islands
Islands of Greece